Two ships have been named Viking Sea :

 , a vehicle carrier launched in 2012
 , a cruise ship launched in 2015

See also
 , a cruise ship launched in 1973

Ship names